Voss is an unincorporated community in Coleman County, Texas, United States. It lies on Farm to Market Road 503 in the southwestern corner of the county, and as of the 2000 Census, had an estimated population of 20.

History
Founded in 1904 as the headquarters of the Leaday Ranch in Coleman County, Voss was named after William G. Voss, a ranch superintendent, who had petitioned for a post office to serve the area. The area was promoted by the landowner, Mabel Doss Day Lea, while she served as lady commissioner of the 1904 World's Fair in St. Louis, Missouri.  After the fair, a flood of eager new farmers descended upon the town, living in tents until their homes could be built. By 1946, Voss had several business (including two hotels and a barber shop), a cotton gin, and its own school, and was home to over 120 residents. By 1980, however, all of Voss' businesses had closed (with the exception of the post office) and the population had fallen to 20, which it maintained through the  2000 Census.

Education
Voss is served by the Panther Creek Consolidated Independent School District.

Climate
The climate in this area is characterized by hot, humid summers and generally mild to cool winters.  According to the Köppen climate classification, Voss has a humid subtropical climate, Cfa on climate maps.

References

Unincorporated communities in Coleman County, Texas
Unincorporated communities in Texas